USS Vicksburg may refer to the following ships of the United States Navy:

  was a steamship, purchased and commissioned by the Navy in 1863, and sold in 1865
  was a gunboat, commissioned in 1897; transferred to the United States Coast Guard in 1922, and out of service in 1944
 , was a  light cruiser, renamed Houston during construction; and served 1942–1947
 , originally named Cheyenne, was a Cleveland-class light cruiser, commissioned in 1944 and struck in 1962
 , originally named Port Royal is a  guided missile cruiser, commissioned in 1992 and in active service

See also 
 , aka City of Vicksburg, a Confederate Navy gunboat

United States Navy ship names